The King's Head is a Grade II listed public house at 1 Roehampton High Street, Roehampton, London SW15 4HL.

It dates back to the 17th century, although altered and extended since then.

References

Pubs in the London Borough of Wandsworth
Grade II listed buildings in the London Borough of Wandsworth
Grade II listed pubs in London
Roehampton